Allan Alvarez (born February 26, 1995), more commonly known as cheese (originally cheese05 until 2018), is a Trinidadian-Spanish speedrunner and podcaster known for his Super Mario 64 records.

Personal life
Born in Venezuela, Alvarez moved to Trinidad when he was two years old. His parents divorced early in his life, which proved to be difficult for Alvarez in his speedrunning endeavors, as his step-father wasn't supportive at first. This has since changed. Alvarez now describes his step-father as someone he can recognize as his real father and someone who has taught him in life how to be persistent and disciplined at whichever craft he wants to pursue. He always was a very strict and tough figure towards Alvarez, but Alvarez claims it helped him to be the strong person he is today. Alvarez is openly gay, and grew aware of the anti-gay culture in Trinidad and Tobago and felt he could not live his true life in the country. He felt more inclined to live a city life and decided to move closer to his father's side of the family in Madrid, Spain. Alvarez made the move in February 2016, just before his 21st birthday, and he currently lives with his grandmother and cousin.

Career
Cheese began streaming his Call of Duty gameplay on Twitch in 2013. In 2014, he started speedrunning and publishing videos to his first YouTube channel. He started uploading to his main channel in 2016. In June 2017, cheese was recognized by Red Bull for his gameplay. Cheese typically streams around midnight in Spain, which is peak viewing hours for the United States.

In Super Mario 64, cheese achieved the world record in the 70-star category on January 24, 2018. He focuses mostly, however, on the 120-star category (essentially 100% completion of the game), where he has held the world record on many occasions throughout his career.

On February 7, 2018, cheese uploaded the first episode of his podcast with speedrunner Ryan Reeves, better known as "Simply", titled Two Dads One Show, a podcast centered on speedrunning and the mentality and work ethic associated with speedrunning. The name was later changed to The Two Dads Podcast. The next day, cheese broke the 120-star world record for Super Mario 64. It was later taken by speedrunner Liam on March 31, 2020.

On October 31, 2018, Alvarez officially changed his username from cheese05 to cheese.

In addition to Super Mario 64, cheese also speedruns The Legend of Zelda: Ocarina of Time, Super Mario Odyssey, and Celeste.

Cheese most recently held the world record in the 120-star category from February 28, 2022 to November 18, 2022, when it was beaten by speedrunner Weegee.

References

Further reading

External links
cheese at Twitch
 cheese Speedrunning at YouTube
cheese_speedrunning at Instagram

1995 births
Living people
Gaming YouTubers
Gay entertainers
LGBT YouTubers
Twitch (service) streamers
Video game speedrunners
Gay sportsmen
LGBT esports players
Mario players
20th-century LGBT people
21st-century LGBT people
Venezuelan people of Trinidad and Tobago descent